This is a list of the bird species recorded in Iran. The avifauna of Iran include a total of 568 species, of which two are endemic, and 4 have been introduced by humans.

This list's taxonomic treatment (designation and sequence of orders, families and species) and nomenclature (common and scientific names) follow the conventions of The Clements Checklist of Birds of the World, 2022 edition. The family accounts at the beginning of each heading reflect this taxonomy, as do the species counts found in each family account. Introduced and accidental species are included in the total counts for Iran.

The following tags have been used to highlight several categories. The commonly occurring native species do not fall into any of these categories.

(A) Accidental - a species that rarely or accidentally occurs in Iran
(E) Endemic - a species endemic to Iran
(I) Introduced - a species introduced to Iran as a consequence, direct or indirect, of human actions
(Ex) Extirpated - a species that no longer occurs in Iran although populations exist elsewhere

Ducks, geese, and waterfowl
Order: AnseriformesFamily: Anatidae

Anatidae includes the ducks and most duck-like waterfowl, such as geese and swans. These birds are adapted to an aquatic existence with webbed feet, flattened bills, and feathers that are excellent at shedding water due to an oily coating.

Lesser whistling-duck, Dendrocygna javanica (A)
Graylag goose, Anser anser
Greater white-fronted goose, Anser albifrons
Lesser white-fronted goose, Anser erythropus (A)
Taiga bean-goose, Anser fabalis (A)
Brant, Branta bernicla (A)
Barnacle goose, Branta leucopsis (A)
Cackling goose, Branta hutchinsii (A)
Red-breasted goose, Branta ruficollis (A)
Snow goose, Chen caerulescens
Black swan, Cygnus atratus
Mute swan, Cygnus olor
Tundra swan, Cygnus columbianus
Whooper swan, Cygnus cygnus
Ruddy shelduck, Tadorna ferruginea
Common shelduck, Tadorna tadorna
Cotton pygmy-goose, Nettapus coromandelianus (A)
Garganey, Spatula querquedula
Northern shoveler, Spatula clypeata
Gadwall, Mareca strepera
Falcated duck, Mareca falcata
Eurasian wigeon, Mareca penelope
Mallard, Anas platyrhynchos
Northern pintail, Anas acuta
Green-winged teal, Anas crecca
Marbled teal, Marmaronetta angustirostris
Red-crested pochard, Netta rufina
Common pochard, Aythya ferina
Ferruginous duck, Aythya nyroca
Tufted duck, Aythya fuligula
Greater scaup, Aythya marila
Velvet scoter, Melanitta fusca (A)
Common scoter, Melanitta nigra (A)
Long-tailed duck, Clangula hyemalis (A)
Common goldeneye, Bucephala clangula
Smew, Mergellus albellus
Common merganser, Mergus merganser
Red-breasted merganser, Mergus serrator
Ruddy duck, Oxyura jamaicensis (I)
White-headed duck, Oxyura leucocephala

Pheasants, grouse, and allies
Order: GalliformesFamily: Phasianidae

The Phasianidae are a family of terrestrial birds. In general, they are plump (although they vary in size) and have broad, relatively short wings.

See-see partridge, Ammoperdix griseogularis
Common quail, Coturnix coturnix
Chukar, Alectoris chukar
Caspian snowcock, Tetraogallus caspius
Black francolin, Francolinus francolinus
Gray francolin, Ortygornis pondicerianus
Ring-necked pheasant, Phasianus colchicus
Green pheasant, Phasianus versicolor
Gray partridge, Perdix perdix
Caucasian grouse, Lyrurus mlokosiewiczi

Flamingos
Order: PhoenicopteriformesFamily: Phoenicopteridae

Flamingos filter-feed on shellfish and algae. Their oddly shaped beaks are specially adapted to separate mud and silt from the food they consume and, uniquely, are used upside-down.

Greater flamingo, Phoenicopterus roseus
Lesser flamingo, Phoenicopterus minor

Grebes
Order: PodicipediformesFamily: Podicipedidae

Grebes are small to medium-large freshwater diving birds. They have lobed toes and are excellent swimmers and divers. However, they have their feet placed far back on the body, making them quite ungainly on land.

Little grebe, Tachybaptus ruficollis
Horned grebe, Podiceps auritus
Red-necked grebe, Podiceps grisegena
Great crested grebe, Podiceps cristatus
Eared grebe, Podiceps nigricollis

Pigeons and doves
Order: ColumbiformesFamily: Columbidae

Pigeons and doves are stout-bodied birds with short necks and short slender bills with a fleshy cere.

Rock pigeon, Columba livia
Stock dove, Columba oenas
Yellow-eyed pigeon, Columba eversmanni (A)
Common wood-pigeon, Columba palumbus
European turtle-dove, Streptopelia turtur
Oriental turtle-dove, Streptopelia orientalis (A)
Eurasian collared-dove, Streptopelia decaocto
Red collared-dove, Streptopelia tranquebarica (A)
Laughing dove, Spilopelia senegalensis

Sandgrouse
Order: PterocliformesFamily: Pteroclidae

Sandgrouse have small, pigeon like heads and necks, but sturdy compact bodies. They have long pointed wings and sometimes tails and a fast direct flight. Flocks fly to watering holes at dawn and dusk. Their legs are feathered down to the toes.

Pallas's sandgrouse, Syrrhaptes paradoxus (A)
Pin-tailed sandgrouse, Pterocles alchata
Chestnut-bellied sandgrouse, Pterocles exustus
Spotted sandgrouse, Pterocles senegallus
Black-bellied sandgrouse, Pterocles orientalis
Crowned sandgrouse, Pterocles coronatus
Lichtenstein's sandgrouse, Pterocles lichtensteinii

Bustards
Order: OtidiformesFamily: Otididae

Bustards are large terrestrial birds mainly associated with dry open country and steppes in the Old World. They are omnivorous and nest on the ground. They walk steadily on strong legs and big toes, pecking for food as they go. They have long broad wings with "fingered" wingtips and striking patterns in flight. Many have interesting mating displays.

Great bustard, Otis tarda
Macqueen's bustard, Chlamydotis macqueenii
Little bustard, Tetrax tetrax

Cuckoos
Order: CuculiformesFamily: Cuculidae

The family Cuculidae includes cuckoos, roadrunners and anis. These birds are of variable size with slender bodies, long tails and strong legs. The Old World cuckoos are brood parasites.

Great spotted cuckoo, Clamator glandarius (A)
Pied cuckoo, Clamator jacobinus (A)
Asian koel, Eudynamys scolopaceus (A)
Common cuckoo, Cuculus canorus
Oriental cuckoo, Cuculus optatus (A)

Nightjars and allies
Order: CaprimulgiformesFamily: Caprimulgidae

Nightjars are medium-sized nocturnal birds that usually nest on the ground. They have long wings, short legs and very short bills. Most have small feet, of little use for walking, and long pointed wings. Their soft plumage is camouflaged to resemble bark or leaves.
Indian nightjar, Caprimulgus asiaticus
Eurasian nightjar, Caprimulgus europaeus
Egyptian nightjar, Caprimulgus aegyptius
Sykes's nightjar, Caprimulgus mahrattensis (A)
Nubian nightjar, Caprimulgus nubicus

Swifts
Order: CaprimulgiformesFamily: Apodidae

Swifts are small birds which spend the majority of their lives flying. These birds have very short legs and never settle voluntarily on the ground, perching instead only on vertical surfaces. Many swifts have long swept-back wings which resemble a crescent or boomerang.

Alpine swift, Apus melba
Common swift, Apus apus
Pacific swift, Apus pacificus
Pallid swift, Apus pallidus
Little swift, Apus affinis

Rails, gallinules, and coots
Order: GruiformesFamily: Rallidae

Rallidae is a large family of small to medium-sized birds which includes the rails, crakes, coots and gallinules. Typically they inhabit dense vegetation in damp environments near lakes, swamps or rivers. In general they are shy and secretive birds, making them difficult to observe. Most species have strong legs and long toes which are well adapted to soft uneven surfaces. They tend to have short, rounded wings and to be weak fliers.

Water rail, Rallus aquaticus
Corn crake, Crex crex
Spotted crake, Porzana porzana
Eurasian moorhen, Gallinula chloropus
Eurasian coot, Fulica atra
Gray-headed swamphen, Porphyrio poliocephalus
Western swamphen, Porphyrio porphyrio
White-breasted waterhen, Amaurornis phoenicurus (A)
Little crake, Zapornia parva
Baillon's crake, Zapornia pusilla

Cranes
Order: GruiformesFamily: Gruidae

Cranes are large, long-legged and long-necked birds. Unlike the similar-looking but unrelated herons, cranes fly with necks outstretched, not pulled back. Most have elaborate and noisy courting displays or "dances".

Demoiselle crane, Anthropoides virgo (A)
Siberian crane, Leucogeranus leucogeranus (A)
Common crane, Grus grus

Thick-knees
Order: CharadriiformesFamily: Burhinidae

The thick-knees are a group of largely tropical waders in the family Burhinidae. They are found worldwide within the tropical zone, with some species also breeding in temperate Europe and Australia. They are medium to large waders with strong black or yellow-black bills, large yellow eyes and cryptic plumage. Despite being classed as waders, most species have a preference for arid or semi-arid habitats.
Indian thick-knee, Burhinus indicus
Eurasian thick-knee, Burhinus oedicnemus
Great thick-knee, Esacus recurvirostris

Stilts and avocets
Order: CharadriiformesFamily: Recurvirostridae

Recurvirostridae is a family of large wading birds, which includes the avocets and stilts. The avocets have long legs and long up-curved bills. The stilts have extremely long legs and long, thin, straight bills.

Black-winged stilt, Himantopus himantopus
Pied avocet, Recurvirostra avosetta

Oystercatchers
Order: CharadriiformesFamily: Haematopodidae

The oystercatchers are large and noisy plover-like birds, with strong bills used for smashing or prising open molluscs.

Eurasian oystercatcher, Haematopus ostralegus

Plovers and lapwings
Order: CharadriiformesFamily: Charadriidae

The family Charadriidae includes the plovers, dotterels and lapwings. They are small to medium-sized birds with compact bodies, short, thick necks and long, usually pointed, wings. They are found in open country worldwide, mostly in habitats near water.

Black-bellied plover, Pluvialis squatarola
European golden-plover, Pluvialis apricaria
Pacific golden-plover, Pluvialis fulva (A)
Northern lapwing, Vanellus vanellus
Spur-winged plover, Vanellus spinosus (A)
Gray-headed lapwing, Vanellus cinereus (A)
Red-wattled lapwing, Vanellus indicus
Sociable lapwing, Vanellus gregarius (A)
White-tailed lapwing, Vanellus leucurus
Lesser sand-plover, Charadrius mongolus
Greater sand-plover, Charadrius leschenaultii
Caspian plover, Charadrius asiaticus
Kentish plover, Charadrius alexandrinus
Common ringed plover, Charadrius hiaticula
Little ringed plover, Charadrius dubius
Eurasian dotterel, Charadrius morinellus

Painted-snipes
Order: CharadriiformesFamily: Rostratulidae

Painted-snipes are short-legged, long-billed birds similar in shape to true snipes, but more brightly colored.

Greater painted-snipe, Rostratula benghalensis (A)

Jacanas
Order: CharadriiformesFamily: Jacanidae

The jacanas are a family of waders which are found throughout the tropics. They are identifiable by their huge feet and claws which enable them to walk on floating vegetation in the shallow lakes that are their preferred habitat.

Pheasant-tailed jacana, Hydrophasianus chirurgus (A)

Sandpipers and allies
Order: CharadriiformesFamily: Scolopacidae

Scolopacidae is a large diverse family of small to medium-sized shorebirds including the sandpipers, curlews, godwits, shanks, tattlers, woodcocks, snipes, dowitchers and phalaropes. The majority of these species eat small invertebrates picked out of the mud or soil. Variation in length of legs and bills enables multiple species to feed in the same habitat, particularly on the coast, without direct competition for food. There are 35 species which have been recorded in Iran.

Whimbrel, Numenius phaeopus
Far Eastern curlew, Numenius madagascariensis (A)
Slender-billed curlew, Numenius tenuirostris (A)
Eurasian curlew, Numenius arquata
Bar-tailed godwit, Limosa lapponica
Black-tailed godwit, Limosa limosa
Ruddy turnstone, Arenaria interpres
Great knot, Calidris tenuirostris 
Red knot, Calidris canutus (A)
Ruff, Calidris pugnax
Broad-billed sandpiper, Calidris falcinellus
Curlew sandpiper, Calidris ferruginea
Long-toed stint, Calidris subminuta
Temminck's stint, Calidris temminckii
Red-necked stint, Calidris ruficollis (A)
Sanderling, Calidris alba
Dunlin, Calidris alpina
Little stint, Calidris minuta
Long-billed dowitcher, Limnodromus scolopaceus
Jack snipe, Lymnocryptes minimus
Eurasian woodcock, Scolopax rusticola
Solitary snipe, Gallinago solitaria (A)
Great snipe, Gallinago media (A)
Common snipe, Gallinago gallinago
Pin-tailed snipe, Gallinago stenura (A)
Terek sandpiper, Xenus cinereus
Red-necked phalarope, Phalaropus lobatus
Red phalarope, Phalaropus fulicarius (A)
Wilson's phalarope, Phalaropus tricolor
Common sandpiper, Actitis hypoleucos
Green sandpiper, Tringa ochropus
Spotted redshank, Tringa erythropus
Common greenshank, Tringa nebularia
Marsh sandpiper, Tringa stagnatilis
Wood sandpiper, Tringa glareola
Common redshank, Tringa totanus

Buttonquail
Order: CharadriiformesFamily: Turnicidae

The buttonquail are small, drab, running birds which resemble the true quails. The female is the brighter of the sexes and initiates courtship. The male incubates the eggs and tends the young.

Small buttonquail, Turnix sylvaticus (A)

Crab-plover
Order: CharadriiformesFamily: Dromadidae

The crab-plover is related to the waders. It resembles a plover but with very long grey legs and a strong heavy black bill similar to a tern. It has black-and-white plumage, a long neck, partially webbed feet and a bill designed for eating crabs.

Crab plover, Dromas ardeola

Pratincoles and coursers
Order: CharadriiformesFamily: Glareolidae

Glareolidae is a family of wading birds comprising the pratincoles, which have short legs, long pointed wings and long forked tails, and the coursers, which have long legs, short wings and long, pointed bills which curve downwards.

Cream-colored courser, Cursorius cursor
Collared pratincole, Glareola pratincola
Oriental pratincole, Glareola maldivarum (A)
Black-winged pratincole, Glareola nordmanni (A)
Small pratincole, Glareola lactea (A)

Skuas and jaegers
Order: CharadriiformesFamily: Stercorariidae

The family Stercorariidae are, in general, medium to large birds, typically with grey or brown plumage, often with white markings on the wings. They nest on the ground in temperate and arctic regions and are long-distance migrants.

Brown skua, Stercorarius antarcticus (A)
Pomarine jaeger, Stercorarius pomarinus
Parasitic jaeger, Stercorarius parasiticus
Long-tailed jaeger, Stercorarius longicaudus (A)

Gulls, terns, and skimmers
Order: CharadriiformesFamily: Laridae

Laridae is a family of medium to large seabirds, the gulls, terns, and skimmers. Gulls are typically grey or white, often with black markings on the head or wings. They have stout, longish bills and webbed feet. Terns are a group of generally medium to large seabirds typically with grey or white plumage, often with black markings on the head. Most terns hunt fish by diving but some pick insects off the surface of fresh water. Terns are generally long-lived birds, with several species known to live in excess of 30 years. Skimmers are a small family of tropical tern-like birds. They have an elongated lower mandible which they use to feed by flying low over the water surface and skimming the water for small fish.

Black-legged kittiwake, Rissa tridactyla (A)
Slender-billed gull, Chroicocephalus genei
Black-headed gull, Chroicocephalus ridibundus (A)
Brown-headed gull, Chroicocephalus brunnicephalus (A)
Little gull, Hydrocoloeus minutus
Mediterranean gull, Ichthyaetus melanocephalus (A)
White-eyed gull, Ichthyaetus leucophthalmus (A)
Sooty gull, Ichthyaetus hemprichii
Pallas's gull, Ichthyaetus ichthyaetus
Common gull, Larus canus
Herring gull, Larus argentatus (A)
Caspian gull, Larus cachinnans
Armenian gull, Larus armenicus
Lesser black-backed gull, Larus fuscus
Glaucous gull, Larus hyperboreus (A)
American herring gull, Larus smithsonianus
Vega gull, Larus vegae
Great black-backed gull, Larus marinus (A)
Heuglin's gull, Larus heuglini
Yellow-legged gull, Larus michahellis
Sabine's gull, Xema sabini
Brown noddy, Anous stolidus (A)
Sooty tern, Onychoprion fuscatus (A)
Bridled tern, Onychoprion anaethetus
Roseate tern, Sterna dougallii
Black-naped tern, Sterna sumatrana
Arctic tern, Sterna paradisaea
Little tern, Sternula albifrons
Saunders's tern, Sternula saundersi
Gull-billed tern, Gelochelidon nilotica
Caspian tern, Hydroprogne caspia
Black tern, Chlidonias niger
White-winged tern, Chlidonias leucopterus
Whiskered tern, Chlidonias hybrida
Common tern, Sterna hirundo
River tern, Sterna aurantia (A)
White-cheeked tern, Sterna repressa
Great crested tern, Thalasseus bergii
Sandwich tern, Thalasseus sandvicensis
Lesser crested tern, Thalasseus bengalensis
Indian skimmer, Rynchops albicollis (A)

Tropicbirds
Order: PhaethontiformesFamily: Phaethontidae

Tropicbirds are slender white birds of tropical oceans, with exceptionally long central tail feathers. Their heads and long wings have black markings.

Red-billed tropicbird, Phaethon aethereus (A)

Loons
Order: GaviiformesFamily: Gaviidae

Loons, known as divers in Europe, are a group of aquatic birds found in many parts of North America and northern Europe. They are the size of a large duck or small goose, which they somewhat resemble when swimming, but to which they are completely unrelated.

Red-throated loon, Gavia stellata (A)
Arctic loon, Gavia arctica (A)

Southern storm-petrels
Order: ProcellariiformesFamily: Oceanitidae

The southern storm-petrels are relatives of the petrels and are the smallest seabirds. They feed on planktonic crustaceans and small fish picked from the surface, typically while hovering. The flight is fluttering and sometimes bat-like.
Black-bellied storm-petrel, Fregetta tropica
White-bellied storm-petrel, Fregetta grallaria
Wilson's storm-petrel, Oceanites oceanicus (A)

Shearwaters and petrels
Order: ProcellariiformesFamily: Procellariidae

The procellariids are the main group of medium-sized "true petrels", characterised by united nostrils with medium septum and a long outer functional primary.
Jouanin's petrel, Bulweria fallax
Bulwer's petrel, Bulweria bulwerii
Cory's shearwater, Calonectris borealis
Flesh-footed shearwater, Ardenna carneipes
Wedge-tailed shearwater, Ardenna pacifica (A)
Sooty shearwater, Ardenna grisea (A)
Tropical shearwater, Ardenna bailoni
Audubon's shearwater, Puffinus iherminieri
Persian shearwater, Puffinus persicus (A)
Little shearwater, Puffinus assimilis 
Subantarctic shearwater, Puffinus elegans

Storks
Order: CiconiiformesFamily: Ciconiidae

Storks are large, long-legged, long-necked, wading birds with long, stout bills. Storks are mute, but bill-clattering is an important mode of communication at the nest. Their nests can be large and may be reused for many years. Many species are migratory.

Black stork, Ciconia nigra
Asian woolly-necked stork, Ciconia episcopus (A)
White stork, Ciconia ciconia

Boobies and gannets
Order: SuliformesFamily: Sulidae

The sulids comprise the gannets and boobies. Both groups are medium to large coastal seabirds that plunge-dive for fish.

Masked booby, Sula dactylatra (A)
Red-footed booby, Sula sula (A)

Anhingas
Order: SuliformesFamily: Anhingidae

Anhingas or darters are often called "snake-birds" because of their long thin neck, which gives a snake-like appearance when they swim with their bodies submerged. The males have black and dark-brown plumage, an erectile crest on the nape and a larger bill than the female. The females have much paler plumage especially on the neck and underparts. The darters have completely webbed feet and their legs are short and set far back on the body. Their plumage is somewhat permeable, like that of cormorants, and they spread their wings to dry after diving.

African darter, Anhinga rufa
Oriental darter, Anhinga melanogaster

Cormorants and Shags
Order: SuliformesFamily: Phalacrocoracidae

Phalacrocoracidae is a family of medium to large coastal, fish-eating seabirds that includes cormorants and shags. Plumage colouration varies, with the majority having mainly dark plumage, some species being black-and-white and a few being colourful.
Little cormorant, Microcarbo niger
Pygmy cormorant, Microcarbo pygmeus
European shag, Gulosus aristotelis
Great cormorant, Phalacrocorax carbo
Indian cormorant, Phalacrocorax fuscicollis
Socotra cormorant, Phalacrocorax nigrogularis

Pelicans
Order: PelecaniformesFamily: Pelecanidae

Pelicans are large water birds with a distinctive pouch under their beak. As with other members of the order Pelecaniformes, they have webbed feet with four toes.

Great white pelican, Pelecanus onocrotalus
Dalmatian pelican, Pelecanus crispus

Herons, egrets, and bitterns
Order: PelecaniformesFamily: Ardeidae

The family Ardeidae contains the bitterns, herons and egrets. Herons and egrets are medium to large wading birds with long necks and legs. Bitterns tend to be shorter necked and more wary. Members of Ardeidae fly with their necks retracted, unlike other long-necked birds such as storks, ibises and spoonbills.

Great bittern, Botaurus stellaris
Little bittern, Ixobrychus minutus
Gray heron, Ardea cinerea
Goliath heron, Ardea goliath
Purple heron, Ardea purpurea
Great egret, Ardea alba
Intermediate egret, Ardea intermedia
Little egret, Egretta garzetta
Western reef-heron, Egretta gularis
Eastern cattle egret, Bubulcus coromandus
Cattle egret, Bubulcus ibis
Squacco heron, Ardeola ralloides
Indian pond-heron, Ardeola grayii
Striated heron, Butorides striata
Black-crowned night-heron, Nycticorax nycticorax

Ibises and spoonbills
Order: PelecaniformesFamily: Threskiornithidae

Threskiornithidae is a family of large terrestrial and wading birds which includes the ibises and spoonbills. They have long, broad wings with 11 primary and about 20 secondary feathers. They are strong fliers and despite their size and weight, very capable soarers.
Glossy ibis, Plegadis falcinellus
African sacred ibis, Threskiornis aethiopicus
Eurasian spoonbill, Platalea leucorodia

Osprey
Order: AccipitriformesFamily: Pandionidae

The family Pandionidae contains only one species, the osprey. The osprey is a medium-large raptor which is a specialist fish-eater with a worldwide distribution.

Osprey, Pandion haliaetus

Hawks, eagles, and kites
Order: AccipitriformesFamily: Accipitridae

Accipitridae is a family of birds of prey, which includes hawks, eagles, kites, harriers and Old World vultures. These birds have powerful hooked beaks for tearing flesh from their prey, strong legs, powerful talons and keen eyesight.

Black-winged kite, Elanus caeruleus
Bearded vulture, Gypaetus barbatus
Egyptian vulture, Neophron percnopterus
European honey-buzzard, Pernis apivorus
Oriental honey-buzzard, Pernis ptilorhynchus
Cinereous vulture, Aegypius monachus
White-rumped vulture, Gyps himalayensis (A)
Himalayan griffon, Gyps fulvus (A)
Eurasian griffon, Gyps fulvus
Red-headed vulture, Sarcogyps calvus
Short-toed snake-eagle, Circaetus gallicus
Lesser spotted eagle, Clanga pomarina
Greater spotted eagle, Clanga clanga
Booted eagle, Hieraaetus pennatus
Tawny eagle, Aquila rapax (A)
Steppe eagle, Aquila nipalensis
Imperial eagle, Aquila heliaca
Golden eagle, Aquila chrysaetos
Bonelli's eagle, Aquila fasciata
White-eyed buzzard, Butastur teesa (A)
Eurasian marsh-harrier, Circus aeruginosus
Eastern marsh-harrier, Circus spilonotus (A)
Hen harrier, Circus cyaneus
Pallid harrier, Circus macrourus
Montagu's harrier, Circus pygargus
Shikra, Accipiter badius
Levant sparrowhawk, Accipiter brevipes
Eurasian sparrowhawk, Accipiter nisus
Northern goshawk, Accipiter gentilis
Crested goshawk, Accipiter trivirgatus
Eurasian buzzard, Buteo buteo
Red kite, Milvus milvus (A)
Black kite, Milvus migrans
Brahminy kite, Haliastur indus
White-tailed eagle, Haliaeetus albicilla
Pallas's fish eagle, Haliaeetus leucoryphus (A) 
Rough-legged hawk, Buteo lagopus (A)
Common buzzard, Buteo buteo
Long-legged buzzard, Buteo rufinus 
Upland buzzard, Buteo hemilasius (A)

Barn-owls
Order: StrigiformesFamily: Tytonidae

Barn-owls are medium to large owls with large heads and characteristic heart-shaped faces. They have long strong legs with powerful talons.

Barn owl, Tyto alba

Owls
Order: StrigiformesFamily: Strigidae

The typical owls are small to large solitary nocturnal birds of prey. They have large forward-facing eyes and ears, a hawk-like beak and a conspicuous circle of feathers around each eye called a facial disk.

Indian scops owl, Otus bakkamoena
Eurasian scops-owl, Otus scops
Pallid scops-owl, Otus brucei (A)
Oriental scops owl, Otus bakkamoena (A)
Eurasian eagle-owl, Bubo bubo (A)
Pharaoh eagle-owl, Bubo ascalaphus (A)
Snowy owl, Bubo scandiacus (A)
Brown fish-owl, Ketupa zeylonensis (A)
Spotted owlet, Athene brama
Little owl, Athene noctua
Tawny owl, Strix aluco
Desert owl, Strix hadorami (A) 
Omani owl, Strix butleri (A)
Long-eared owl, Asio otus
Short-eared owl, Asio flammeus
Boreal owl, Aegolius funereus (A)

Hoopoes
Order: BucerotiformesFamily: Upupidae

Hoopoes have black, white and orangey-pink colouring with a large erectile crest on their head.

Eurasian hoopoe, Upupa epops

Kingfishers
Order: CoraciiformesFamily: Alcedinidae

Kingfishers are medium-sized birds with large heads, long, pointed bills, short legs and stubby tails.

Common kingfisher, Alcedo atthis
White-throated kingfisher, Halcyon smyrnensis
Pied kingfisher, Ceryle rudis

Bee-eaters
Order: CoraciiformesFamily: Meropidae

The bee-eaters are a group of near passerine birds in the family Meropidae. Most species are found in Africa but others occur in southern Europe, Madagascar, Australia and New Guinea. They are characterised by richly coloured plumage, slender bodies and usually elongated central tail feathers. All are colourful and have long downturned bills and pointed wings, which give them a swallow-like appearance when seen from afar.

Asian green bee-eater, Merops orientalis
Blue-cheeked bee-eater, Merops persicus
European bee-eater, Merops apiaster

Rollers
Order: CoraciiformesFamily: Coraciidae

Rollers resemble crows in size and build, but are more closely related to the kingfishers and bee-eaters. They share the colourful appearance of those groups with blues and browns predominating. The two inner front toes are connected, but the outer toe is not.

European roller, Coracias garrulus
Indian roller, Coracias benghalensis

Woodpeckers
Order: PiciformesFamily: Picidae

Woodpeckers are small to medium-sized birds with chisel-like beaks, short legs, stiff tails and long tongues used for capturing insects. Some species have feet with two toes pointing forward and two backward, while several species have only three toes. Many woodpeckers have the habit of tapping noisily on tree trunks with their beaks.

Eurasian wryneck, Jynx torquilla
Middle spotted woodpecker, Dendrocoptes medius
Great spotted woodpecker, Dendrocopos major
White-backed woodpecker, Dendrocopos leucotos
White-winged woodpecker, Dendrocopos leucopterus (A)
Syrian woodpecker, Dendrocopos syriacus
Sind woodpecker, Dendrocopos assimilis
Lesser spotted woodpecker, Dryobates minorScaly-bellied woodpecker, Picus squamatus (A)
Grey-headed woodpecker, Picus canus
Eurasian green woodpecker, Picus viridis
Black woodpecker, Dryocopus martius
Greater yellownape, chrysophlegma flavinucha

Falcons and caracarasOrder: FalconiformesFamily: Falconidae

Falconidae is a family of diurnal birds of prey. They differ from hawks, eagles and kites in that they kill with their beaks instead of their talons.

Lesser kestrel, Falco naumanni
Eurasian kestrel, Falco tinnunculus
Red-necked falcon, Falco chicquera (A)
Red-footed falcon, Falco vespertinus (A)
Amur falcon, Falco amurensis (A) 
Sooty falcon, Falco concolor
Merlin, Falco columbarius
Eurasian hobby, Falco subbuteo
Lanner falcon, Falco biarmicus (A)
Laggar falcon, Falco jugger (A)
Saker falcon, Falco cherrug
Peregrine falcon, Falco peregrinus
Gyrfalcon, Falco rusticolus

Old World parrotsOrder: PsittaciformesFamily: Psittaculidae

Characteristic features of parrots include a strong curved bill, an upright stance, strong legs, and clawed zygodactyl feet. Many parrots are vividly coloured, and some are multi-coloured. Old World parrots are found from Africa east across south and southeast Asia and Oceania to Australia and New Zealand.

Alexandrine parakeet, Psittacula eupatria (I)
Rose-ringed parakeet, Psittacula krameri (I)

Old World oriolesOrder: PasseriformesFamily: Oriolidae

The Old World orioles are colourful passerine birds. They are not related to the New World orioles.

Eurasian golden oriole, Oriolus oriolus
Indian golden oriole, Oriolus kundoo (A)

DrongosOrder: PasseriformesFamily: Dicruridae

The drongos are mostly black or dark grey in colour, sometimes with metallic tints. They have long forked tails, and some Asian species have elaborate tail decorations. They have short legs and sit very upright when perched, like a shrike. They flycatch or take prey from the ground.

Black drongo, Dicrurus macrocercus (A)
Ashy drongo, Dicrurus leucophaeus (A)

Monarch flycatchersOrder: PasseriformesFamily: Monarchidae

The monarch flycatchers are small to medium-sized insectivorous passerines which hunt by flycatching.

Black-naped monarch, Hypothymis azurea (A)
Indian paradise flycatcher, Terpsiphone paradisi

ShrikesOrder: PasseriformesFamily: Laniidae

Shrikes are passerine birds known for their habit of catching other birds and small animals and impaling the uneaten portions of their bodies on thorns. A typical shrike's beak is hooked, like a bird of prey.

Red-backed shrike, Lanius collurio
Red-tailed shrike, Lanius phoenicuroides
Isabelline shrike, Lanius isabellinus
Brown shrike, Lanius cristatus (A)
Bay-backed shrike, Lanius vittatus
Long-tailed shrike, Lanius schach (A)
Great gray shrike, Lanius excubitor
Iberian grey shrike, Lanius meridionalis
Lesser gray shrike, Lanius minor
Masked shrike, Lanius nubicus
Woodchat shrike, Lanius senator

Crows, jays, and magpiesOrder: PasseriformesFamily: Corvidae

The family Corvidae includes crows, ravens, jays, choughs, magpies, treepies, nutcrackers and ground jays. Corvids are above average in size among the Passeriformes, and some of the larger species show high levels of intelligence.

Eurasian jay, Garrulus glandarius
Eurasian magpie, Pica pica
Turkestan ground-jay , Podoces panderi
Iranian ground-jay, Podoces pleskei (E)
Eurasian nutcracker, Nucifraga caryocatactes (A)
Red-billed chough, Pyrrhocorax pyrrhocorax
Yellow-billed chough, Pyrrhocorax graculus
Eurasian jackdaw, Corvus monedula
House crow, Corvus splendens
Rook, Corvus frugilegus
Carrion crow, Corvus corone
Hooded crow, Corvus cornix
Large-billed crow, Corvus macrorhynchos
Brown-necked raven, Corvus ruficollis
Common raven, Corvus corax

Tits, chickadees, and titmiceOrder: PasseriformesFamily: Paridae

The Paridae are mainly small stocky woodland species with short stout bills. Some have crests. They are adaptable birds, with a mixed diet including seeds and insects.

Coal tit, Periparus ater
Sombre tit, Poecile lugubris
Caspian tit, Poecile hyrcanus (E)
Marsh tit, Poecile palustris
Eurasian blue tit, Cyanistes caeruleus
Azure tit, Cyanistes cyanus
Yellow-breasted tit, Cyanistes flavipectus
Great tit, Parus major
Cinereous tit, Parus cinereus

Penduline-titsOrder: PasseriformesFamily: Remizidae

The penduline-tits are a group of small passerine birds related to the true tits. They are insectivores.

Eurasian penduline-tit, Remiz pendulinus
Black-headed penduline-tit, Remiz macronyx
White-crowned penduline-tit, Remiz coronatus (A)

LarksOrder: PasseriformesFamily: Alaudidae

Larks are small terrestrial birds with often extravagant songs and display flights. Most larks are fairly dull in appearance. Their food is insects and seeds.

Greater hoopoe-lark, Alaemon alaudipes
Bar-tailed lark, Ammomanes cinctura
Desert lark, Ammomanes deserti
Black-crowned sparrow-lark, Eremopterix nigriceps
Horned lark, Eremophila alpestris
Greater short-toed lark, Calandrella brachydactyla
Hume's lark, Calandrella acutirostris (A)
Mongolian short-toed lark, Calandrella dukhunensis
Bimaculated lark, Melanocorypha bimaculata
Calandra lark, Melanocorypha calandra
Black lark, Melanocorypha yeltoniensis (A)
Asian short-toed lark, Alaudala cheleensis
Turkestan short-toed lark, Alaudala heinei
Sand lark, Alaudala raytal
Turkestan short-toed lark, Alaudala heinei
Wood lark, Lullula arborea
White-winged lark, Alauda leucoptera (A)
Eurasian skylark, Alauda arvensis
Oriental skylark, Alauda gulgula
Crested lark, Galerida cristata

Bearded reedlingOrder: PasseriformesFamily: Panuridae

This species, the only one in its family, is found in reed beds throughout temperate Europe and Asia.

Bearded reedling, Panurus biarmicus

Cisticolas and alliesOrder: PasseriformesFamily: Cisticolidae

The Cisticolidae are warblers found mainly in warmer southern regions of the Old World. They are generally very small birds of drab brown or grey appearance found in open country such as grassland or scrub.

Graceful prinia, Prinia gracilis
Delicate prinia, Prinia lepida
Zitting cisticola, Cisticola juncidis

Reed warblers and alliesOrder: PasseriformesFamily: Acrocephalidae

The members of this family are usually rather large for "warblers". Most are rather plain olivaceous brown above with much yellow to beige below. They are usually found in open woodland, reedbeds, or tall grass. The family occurs mostly in southern to western Eurasia and surroundings, but it also ranges far into the Pacific, with some species in Africa.

Booted warbler, Iduna caligata
Sykes's warbler, Iduna rama
Eastern olivaceous warbler, Iduna pallida
Upcher's warbler, Hippolais languida
Icterine warbler, Hippolais icterina
Olive-tree warbler, Hippolais olivetorum
Moustached warbler, Acrocephalus melanopogon
Sedge warbler, Acrocephalus schoenobaenus
Paddyfield warbler, Acrocephalus agricola (A)
Blyth's reed warbler, Acrocephalus dumetorum (A)
Marsh warbler, Acrocephalus palustris (A)
Aquatic warbler, Acrocephalus paludicola
Eurasian reed warbler, Acrocephalus scirpaceus
Basra reed warbler, Acrocephalus griseldis
Great reed warbler, Acrocephalus arundinaceus
Clamorous reed warbler, Acrocephalus stentoreus

Grassbirds and allies Order: PasseriformesFamily: Locustellidae

Locustellidae are a family of small insectivorous songbirds found mainly in Eurasia, Africa, and the Australian region. They are smallish birds with tails that are usually long and pointed, and tend to be drab brownish or buffy all over.

River warbler, Locustella fluviatilis (A)
Savi's warbler, Locustella luscinioides (A)
Common grasshopper-warbler, Locustella naevia (A)

SwallowsOrder: PasseriformesFamily: Hirundinidae

The family Hirundinidae is adapted to aerial feeding. They have a slender streamlined body, long pointed wings and a short bill with a wide gape. The feet are adapted to perching rather than walking, and the front toes are partially joined at the base.

Gray-throated martin, Riparia chinensis (A)
Brown-throated martin, Riparia paludicola
Bank swallow, Riparia riparia
Pale sand martin, Riparia diluta (A)
Eurasian crag-martin, Ptyonoprogne rupestris
Rock martin, Ptyonoprogne fuligula
Pale crag-martin, Ptyonoprogne obsoleta
Barn swallow, Hirundo rustica
Wire-tailed swallow, Hirundo smithii (A)
Red-rumped swallow, Cecropis daurica
Streak-throated swallow, Petrochelidon fluvicola (A)
Common house-martin, Delichon urbicum

BulbulsOrder: PasseriformesFamily: Pycnonotidae

Bulbuls are medium-sized songbirds. Some are colourful with yellow, red or orange vents, cheeks, throats or supercilia, but most are drab, with uniform olive-brown to black plumage. Some species have distinct crests.

Red-vented bulbul, Pycnonotus cafer (I)
White-eared bulbul, Pycnonotus leucotis

Leaf warblersOrder: PasseriformesFamily: Phylloscopidae

Leaf warblers are a family of small insectivorous birds found mostly in Eurasia and ranging into Wallacea and Africa. The species are of various sizes, often green-plumaged above and yellow below, or more subdued with grayish-green to grayish-brown colors.
Arctic warbler, Phylloscopus borealis
Wood warbler, Phylloscopus sibilatrix (A)
Eastern Bonelli's warbler, Phylloscopus orientalis (A)
Yellow-browed warbler, Phylloscopus inornatus (A)
Hume's warbler, Phylloscopus humei (A)
Iberian chiffchaff, Phylloscopus ibericus
Pallas's leaf warbler, Phylloscopus proregulus (A)
Dusky warbler, Phylloscopus fuscatus (A)
Plain leaf warbler, Phylloscopus neglectus
Willow warbler, Phylloscopus trochilus
Mountain chiffchaff, Phylloscopus sindianus
Common chiffchaff, Phylloscopus collybita
Green warbler, Phylloscopus nitidus
Greenish warbler, Phylloscopus trochiloides (A)

Bush warblers and alliesOrder: PasseriformesFamily: Scotocercidae

The members of this family are found throughout Africa, Asia, and Polynesia. Their taxonomy is in flux, and some authorities place some genera in other families.

Scrub warbler, Scotocerca inquieta
Cetti's warbler, Cettia cetti

Long-tailed titsOrder: PasseriformesFamily: Aegithalidae

Long-tailed tits are a group of small passerine birds with medium to long tails. They make woven bag nests in trees. Most eat a mixed diet which includes insects.

Long-tailed tit, Aegithalos caudatus

Sylviid warblers, parrotbills, and alliesOrder: PasseriformesFamily: Sylviidae

The family Sylviidae is a group of small insectivorous passerine birds. They mainly occur as breeding species, as the common name implies, in Europe, Asia and, to a lesser extent, Africa. Most are of generally undistinguished appearance, but many have distinctive songs.

Eurasian blackcap, Sylvia atricapilla
Garden warbler, Sylvia borin
Asian desert warbler, Curruca nana
Barred warbler, Curruca nisoria
Lesser whitethroat, Curruca curruca
Western Orphean warbler, Curruca hortensis
Eastern Orphean warbler, Curruca crassirostris
Sardinian warbler, Curruca melanocephala
Menetries's warbler, Curruca mystacea
Rüppell's warbler, Curruca ruppeli (A)
Greater whitethroat, Curruca communis
Spectacled warbler, Curruca conspicillata
Desert whitethroat, Curruca minula
Hume's whitethroat, Curruca althaea

White-eyes, yuhinas, and alliesOrder: PasseriformesFamily: Zosteropidae

The white-eyes are small and mostly undistinguished, their plumage above being generally some dull color like greenish-olive, but some species have a white or bright yellow throat, breast, or lower parts, and several have buff flanks. As their name suggests, many species have a white ring around each eye.

Indian white-eye, Zosterops palpebrosus

Laughingthrushes and alliesOrder: PasseriformesFamily: Leiothrichidae

The members of this family are diverse in size and coloration, though those of genus Turdoides tend to be brown or grayish. The family is found in Africa, India, and southeast Asia.

Iraq babbler, Argya altirostris
Common babbler, Argya caudata
Afghan babbler, Argya huttoni

KingletsOrder: PasseriformesFamily: Regulidae

The kinglets, also called crests, are a small group of birds often included in the Old World warblers, but frequently given family status because they also resemble the titmice.

Goldcrest, Regulus regulus

WallcreeperOrder: PasseriformesFamily: Tichodromidae

The wallcreeper is a small bird related to the nuthatch family, which has stunning crimson, grey and black plumage.

Wallcreeper, Tichodroma muraria

NuthatchesOrder: PasseriformesFamily: Sittidae

Nuthatches are small woodland birds. They have the unusual ability to climb down trees head first, unlike other birds which can only go upwards. Nuthatches have big heads, short tails and powerful bills and feet.

Eurasian nuthatch, Sitta europaea
Krüper's nuthatch, Sitta krueperi
Western rock nuthatch, Sitta neumayer
Eastern rock nuthatch, Sitta tephronota

TreecreepersOrder: PasseriformesFamily: Certhiidae

Treecreepers are small woodland birds, brown above and white below. They have thin pointed down-curved bills, which they use to extricate insects from bark. They have stiff tail feathers, like woodpeckers, which they use to support themselves on vertical trees.

Eurasian treecreeper, Certhia familiaris
Bar-tailed treecreeper, Certhia himalayana

WrensOrder: PasseriformesFamily: Troglodytidae

The wrens are mainly small and inconspicuous except for their loud songs. These birds have short wings and thin down-turned bills. Several species often hold their tails upright. All are insectivorous.

Eurasian wren, Troglodytes troglodytes

DippersOrder: PasseriformesFamily: Cinclidae

Dippers are a group of perching birds whose habitat includes aquatic environments in the Americas, Europe and Asia. They are named for their bobbing or dipping movements.

White-throated dipper, Cinclus cinclus

StarlingsOrder: PasseriformesFamily: Sturnidae

Starlings are small to medium-sized passerine birds. Their flight is strong and direct and they are very gregarious. Their preferred habitat is fairly open country. They eat insects and fruit. Plumage is typically dark with a metallic sheen.

European starling, Sturnus vulgaris
Rosy starling, Pastor roseus (A)
Brahminy starling, Sturnia pagodarum 
Chestnut-tailed starling, Sturnia malabarica (A)
Common myna, Acridotheres tristis
Bank myna, Acridotheres ginginianus

Thrushes and alliesOrder: PasseriformesFamily: Turdidae

The thrushes are a group of passerine birds that occur mainly in the Old World. They are plump, soft plumaged, small to medium-sized insectivores or sometimes omnivores, often feeding on the ground. Many have attractive songs.

Mistle thrush, Turdus viscivorus
Song thrush, Turdus philomelos
Redwing, Turdus iliacus
Eurasian blackbird, Turdus merula
Fieldfare, Turdus pilaris
Ring ouzel, Turdus torquatus
Black-throated thrush, Turdus atrogularis
Red-throated thrush, Turdus ruficollis (A)
Grey-winged blackbird, Turdus boulboul 
White's thrush, Zoothera aurea

Old World flycatchersOrder: PasseriformesFamily: Muscicapidae

Old World flycatchers are a large group of small passerine birds native to the Old World. They are mainly small arboreal insectivores. The appearance of these birds is highly varied, but they mostly have weak songs and harsh calls.

Spotted flycatcher, Muscicapa striata
Asian brown flycatcher, Muscicapa dauurica
Rufous-tailed scrub-robin, Cercotrichas galactotes
Verditer flycatcher, Eumyias thalassinus (A)
European robin, Erithacus rubecula
White-throated robin, Irania gutturalis
Thrush nightingale, Luscinia luscinia
Common nightingale, Luscinia megarhynchos
Bluethroat, Luscinia svecica
Blue whistling-thrush, Myophonus caeruleus(A)
Ultramarine flycatcher, Ficedula superciliaris (A)
Taiga flycatcher, Ficedula albicilla (A)
Collared flycatcher, Ficedula albicollis
Red-breasted flycatcher, Ficedula parva
Semicollared flycatcher, Ficedula semitorquata
European pied flycatcher, Ficedula hypoleuca (A)
Güldenstädt's redstart, Phoenicurus erythrogastrus
Rufous-backed redstart, Phoenicurus erythronotus
Plumbeous redstart, Phoenicurus fuliginosus
Common redstart, Phoenicurus phoenicurus
Black redstart, Phoenicurus ochruros
Rufous-tailed rock-thrush, Monticola saxatilis
Blue rock-thrush, Monticola solitarius
Black redstart, Phoenicurus ochruros
Common redstart, Phoenicurus phoenicurus
Whinchat, Saxicola rubetra
European stonechat, Saxicola rubicola (A)
Siberian stonechat, Saxicola maurus
Pied bushchat, Saxicola caprata
Northern wheatear, Oenanthe oenanthe
Isabelline wheatear, Oenanthe isabellina
Hooded wheatear, Oenanthe monacha
Desert wheatear, Oenanthe deserti
Pied wheatear, Oenanthe pleschanka
Eastern black-eared wheatear, Oenanthe melanoleuca
Variable wheatear, Oenanthe picata
Hume's wheatear, Oenanthe albonigra
White-crowned wheatear, Oenanthe leucopyga (A)
Finsch's wheatear, Oenanthe finschii
Mourning wheatear, Oenanthe lugens
Kurdish wheatear, Oenanthe xanthoprymna
Persian wheatear, Oenanthe chrysopygia
Eastern black-eared wheatear, Oenanthe melanoleuca
Rufous-bellied niltava, Niltava sundara

WaxwingsOrder: PasseriformesFamily: Bombycillidae

The waxwings are a group of birds with soft silky plumage and unique red tips to some of the wing feathers. In the Bohemian and cedar waxwings, these tips look like sealing wax and give the group its name. These are arboreal birds of northern forests. They live on insects in summer and berries in winter.

Bohemian waxwing, Bombycilla garrulus (A)

HypocoliusOrder: PasseriformesFamily: Hypocoliidae

The grey hypocolius is a small Middle Eastern bird with the shape and soft plumage of a waxwing. They are mainly a uniform grey colour except the males have a black triangular mask around their eyes.

Hypocolius, Hypocolius ampelinus

Sunbirds and spiderhuntersOrder: PasseriformesFamily: Nectariniidae

The sunbirds and spiderhunters are very small passerine birds which feed largely on nectar, although they will also take insects, especially when feeding young. Flight is fast and direct on their short wings. Most species can take nectar by hovering like a hummingbird, but usually perch to feed.

Purple sunbird, Cinnyris asiaticus
Shining sunbird, Cinnyris habessinicus

Waxbills and alliesOrder: PasseriformesFamily: Estrildidae

The estrildid finches are small passerine birds of the Old World tropics and Australasia. They are gregarious and often colonial seed eaters with short thick but pointed bills. They are all similar in structure and habits, but have wide variation in plumage colours and patterns.

Red avadavat, Amandava amandava (A)
Indian silverbill, Euodice malabarica
Scaly-breasted munia, Lonchura punctulata
Zebra finch, Taeniopygia guttata

Weavers and allies
Black-breasted weaver, Ploceus benghalensis
Red fody, Foudia madagascariensis

AccentorsOrder: PasseriformesFamily: Prunellidae

The accentors are in the only bird family, Prunellidae, which is completely endemic to the Palearctic. They are small, fairly drab species superficially similar to sparrows.

Alpine accentor, Prunella collaris
Radde's accentor, Prunella ocularis
Black-throated accentor, Prunella atrogularis (A)
Dunnock, Prunella modularis

Old World sparrowsOrder: PasseriformesFamily: Passeridae

Old World sparrows are small passerine birds. In general, sparrows tend to be small, plump, brown or grey birds with short tails and short powerful beaks. Sparrows are seed eaters, but they also consume small insects.

Saxaul sparrow, Passer ammodendri (A)
House sparrow, Passer domesticus
Spanish sparrow, Passer hispaniolensis
Sind sparrow, Passer pyrrhonotus (A)
Dead Sea sparrow, Passer moabiticus
Zarudny's sparrow, Passer zarudnyi (A)
Eurasian tree sparrow, Passer montanus
Yellow-throated sparrow, Gymnoris xanthocollis
Rock sparrow, Petronia petronia
Pale rockfinch, Carpospiza brachydactyla
White-winged snowfinch, Montifringilla nivalis

Wagtails and pipitsOrder: PasseriformesFamily: Motacillidae

Motacillidae is a family of small passerine birds with medium to long tails. They include the wagtails, longclaws and pipits. They are slender, ground feeding insectivores of open country.

Forest wagtail, Dendronanthus indicus (A)
Gray wagtail, Motacilla cinerea
Western yellow wagtail, Motacilla flava
Citrine wagtail, Motacilla citreola
White wagtail, Motacilla alba
Richard's pipit, Anthus richardi (A)
Paddyfield pipit, Anthus rufulus (A)
Long-billed pipit, Anthus similis
Tawny pipit, Anthus campestris
Meadow pipit, Anthus pratensis
Tree pipit, Anthus trivialis
Olive-backed pipit, Anthus hodgsoni (A)
Red-throated pipit, Anthus cervinus
Water pipit, Anthus spinoletta
American pipit, Anthus rubescens (A)
African pipit, Anthus cinnamomeus

Finches, euphonias, and alliesOrder: PasseriformesFamily: Fringillidae

Finches are seed-eating passerine birds, that are small to moderately large and have a strong beak, usually conical and in some species very large. All have twelve tail feathers and nine primaries. These birds have a bouncing flight with alternating bouts of flapping and gliding on closed wings, and most sing well.

Common chaffinch, Fringilla coelebs
Brambling, Fringilla montifringilla
White-winged grosbeak, Mycerobas carnipes
Black-and-yellow grosbeak, Mycerobas icterioides
Hawfinch, Coccothraustes coccothraustes
Common rosefinch, Carpodacus erythrinus
Red-mantled rosefinch, Carpodacus rhodochlamys
Great rosefinch, Carpodacus rubicilla 
Eurasian bullfinch, Pyrrhula pyrrhula (A)
Crimson-winged finch, Rhodopechys sanguineus
Trumpeter finch, Bucanetes githagineus
Mongolian finch, Bucanetes mongolicus
Desert finch, Rhodospiza obsoleta
European greenfinch, Chloris chloris
Yellow-breasted greenfinch, Chloris spinoides
Twite, Carduelis flavirostris
Eurasian linnet, Carduelis cannabina
Red crossbill, Loxia curvirostra (A)
European goldfinch, Carduelis carduelis
European serin, Serinus serinus (A)
Fire-fronted serin, Serinus pusillus
Eurasian siskin, Spinus spinus

Longspurs and snow buntingsOrder: PasseriformesFamily: Calcariidae

The Calcariidae are a family of birds that had been traditionally grouped with the New World sparrows, but differ in a number of respects and are usually found in open grassy areas.

Lapland longspur, Calcarius lapponicus (A)

Old World buntingsOrder: PasseriformesFamily''': Emberizidae

The emberizids are a large family of passerine birds. They are seed-eating birds with distinctively shaped bills. Many emberizid species have distinctive head patterns.

Black-headed bunting, Emberiza melanocephalaRed-headed bunting, Emberiza brunicepsCorn bunting, Emberiza calandraRock bunting, Emberiza ciaCirl bunting, Emberiza cirlusWhite-capped bunting, Emberiza stewarti (A)
Yellowhammer, Emberiza citrinellaPine bunting, Emberiza leucocephalosGray-necked bunting, Emberiza buchananiCinereous bunting, Emberiza cineracea (A)
Ortolan bunting, Emberiza hortulanaCretzschmar's bunting, Emberiza caesia (A)
Striolated bunting, Emberiza striolataReed bunting, Emberiza schoeniclusYellow-breasted bunting, Emberiza aureola (A)
Little bunting, Emberiza pusilla (A)
Rustic bunting, Emberiza rustica'' (A)

See also
List of birds
Lists of birds by region
Wildlife of Iran

References

Iran
Iran
Birds
Iran
Birds